Pełczyska  is a village in the administrative district of Gmina Złota, within Pińczów County, Świętokrzyskie Voivodeship, in south-central Poland.

The village has an approximate population of 460.

See also
 The Lesser Polish Way

References

Villages in Pińczów County